Cloudland Canyon State Park is a  Georgia state park located near Trenton and Cooper Heights on the western edge of Lookout Mountain.  One of the largest and most scenic parks in Georgia, it contains rugged geology, and offers visitors a range of vistas across the deep gorge cut through the mountain by Sitton Gulch Creek, where the elevation varies from 800 to over 1,800 feet.  Views of the canyon can be seen from the picnic area parking lot, in addition to additional views located along the rim trail.  At the bottom of the gorge, two waterfalls cascade across layers of sandstone and shale, ending in small pools below.

The park, previously known as Sitton Gulch (or Gulf) or Trenton Gulf, was purchased in stages by the state of Georgia beginning in 1938. Under President Franklin D. Roosevelt, a project of Civilian Conservation Corps during the Great Depression built the first facilities and signs in the park, which opened the following year. Today the park features a variety of campsites, cabins, hiking and recreational activities.

History
Cloudland Canyon was designated a state park in 1939 when the state began acquiring land from private owners. Three of these owners, from the Mathews, McCauley and McKaig families, still reside in the area. Expansion of the park continues sporadically as new land is purchased for it.

Until 1939 the only access to the area (and much of Dade County, Georgia) was through Tennessee or Alabama. That year Georgia began work on Highway 136 to connect U.S. 41 to the recently established park. The Civilian Conservation Corps did much of the early work to construct the state park and access roads.

Geology

The park is located on the Cumberland Plateau, atop Lookout Mountain. On the summit of Lookout Mountain, the waters of Daniel Creek and Bear Creek cut gorges through the rock, converging to form Sitton Gulch Creek. The flat-topped mountains of the Cumberland Plateau are significantly different from the narrow Armuchee ridges beyond nearby Chickamauga Valley to the east. From a geological standpoint, Lookout Mountain is transitional between the flat-lying sedimentary beds of central Tennessee, and the ridges and valley to the east, which display more intensive folding and faulting. Most of the canyon's rock formations consist of sandstone; shale layers below the sandstone are marked by pine trees.

Lookout Mountain was created through a combination of tectonic activity and erosion. It was uplifted during the period of mountain building that formed the Appalachians, known as the Appalachian orogeny. Over 200 million years ago, the modern-day parklands lay beneath an ocean. When first formed, the entire mountain was underwater, but the rim of the canyon eventually became a beach along the edge of the receding ocean.  As the ocean dried up, Sitton Gulch Creek and its tributaries, particularly Daniel Creek, eroded the rock. The sandstone forming the bluffs has a tendency to fracture into blocks, creating unusual boulder formations. The concave shape of the top of Lookout Mountain also drains rainwater through fissures into the underlying limestone, forming miles of caves in the area.

The bottom of Cloudland canyon contains a slope of rock talus, which are sandstone and shale fragments. The valley floor is also rich in fossil-bearing limestone.

Hiking trails

The Park contains several well-marked trails which allow visitors to view the geology of the canyon and its surroundings. The park also features four more extensive hiking trails, including one backpacking trail. These trails are generally considered moderate in difficulty.

The Waterfalls Trail begins on a paved section, at the main overlook, and progresses into the canyon along a 40-degree slope. Most of the trail consists of gravel, and a 600-step staircase. The trail is generally considered to be a strenuous hike, which can take up to 90 minutes to complete. Each cascades into small pools at the base of the canyon, and continue down through a boulder-strewn stream bed. The creek flow feeding the waterfalls varies considerably according to the season. The Sitton's Gulch trail, commencing at the bottom of the Waterfalls Trail, runs parallel to the creek until it ends in a parking area in Trenton.

A scenic hike beginning at the Daniels Creek Bridge, it offers panoramic views before climbing out of the canyon and onto the plateau. This trail also provides views of Trenton, Georgia, neighboring Sand Mountain, and of Cloudland Canyon. Rhododendron and mountain laurel thickets are  interspersed with sour gum and dogwood; large oaks, hickories, hemlocks and maples shade the trail. Cottages and walk-in camping areas are accessible via the West Rim Loop. Passing over varied terrain, most of the hike is moderately difficult, and is considered strenuous along several short sections.

The  Backcountry Loop Trail provides access to the park's eleven secluded primitive hike-in camping sites.  Beginning at the parking area for group camping, the trail passes through hemlock groves, before descending on a moderate grade into a hollow filled with spring and summer flowers. At the far end of the loop, hikers emerge from the hemlock groves onto level trail, among oaks and hickories, before returning to the parking area.

In the fall of 2011, the park reopened the Bear Creek Trail, which had been closed to hikers for nearly a decade.  This approximately  trail is the longest trail in the park. This trail begins as a spur off of the Back Country Trail and drops down to Bear Creek.  After crossing the creek, the trail continues up until it becomes a loop around the northeast portion of the park. Around the area of the creek, the trail crosses over private property for a brief distance. During wet seasons, the creek crossing can be difficult as there is no bridge or dry crossing available.

Facilities and activities
Cloudland Canyon State park features a variety of camping and lodging options. There are 16 rental cottages as well as a group lodge. The park also offers 62 tent, trailer and RV sites, 28 walk-in camp sites, and 10 backcountry camp sites for backpackers. Four pioneer campsites provide facilities for groups of tent campers. The East Rim has 24 camp sites located along a loop road; many of the sites can accommodate RVs, and all feature water and electric hookups. Bathing facilities are located nearby. The West Rim Camp ground, located across the gorge and away from the park's busiest section, is located in thick forest, and hosts approximately 48 camp sites spread along two loops. It too offers bathing facilities.

Picnic areas include a group pavilion, tennis courts, a children's playground and a disc golf course. The park has an interpretive center near the main parking lot, adjacent to the canyon.  Annual events hosted in the park include a Wildflower Program in April, Adventure Weekend (also in April), and a Kids' Catfish Rodeo in May.

See also

Lula Lake Land Trust

Notes

References

Further reading

Griffin, Martha and Robert Atkins. Geologic Guide to Cloudland Canyon State Park. (Pamphlet available at Cloudland Canyon State Park)

External links

Georgia State Parks-Cloudland Canyon

Lookout Mountain
State parks of Georgia (U.S. state)
State parks of the Appalachians
Canyons and gorges of Georgia (U.S. state)
Protected areas of Dade County, Georgia
Protected areas of Walker County, Georgia
Civilian Conservation Corps in Georgia (U.S. state)
Protected areas established in 1938
Landforms of Dade County, Georgia
Landforms of Walker County, Georgia
1938 establishments in Georgia (U.S. state)